

A dim sim is a Chinese-inspired meat and vegetable dumpling-style snack food, popular in Australia and to a lesser extent in New Zealand. It was popularized by a Chinese immigrant in Melbourne who originally came from Guangdong, William Chen Wing Young, the father of Australian celebrity chef, author  and TV personality Elizabeth Chong. The name derives from the pronunciation diim syiim (點心) in Toisanese, the predominant dialect spoken at the time by central Melbourne's Chinese community.

Description
The commercial snack food normally consists of minced meat, cabbage, and seasoning, encased in a wrapper similar to that of a traditional siu mai dumpling. They are typically rectangular, or sometimes a larger circular shape. They are mainly served steamed, sometimes deep fried, and are commonly dressed or dipped in soy sauce. An alternative way of cooking dim sims is to barbeque them, by cutting the dim sim in half along the long side and placing on a hot barbeque. A barbequed dim sim is known as a "Moe Cray" after the Victorian township of Moe. Vegetarian-style dim sim normally contains cabbage, carrot, vermicelli, Chinese shiitake mushroom or other vegetable fillings, along with seasoning, although these are not generally available in commercial outlets.  

Dim sims differ from typical Chinese dumplings in that they are often much larger, have a thicker, doughier skin and are shaped more robustly.
They are primarily sold in fish and chip shops, service stations, corner shops, and some Chinese restaurants and takeaway outlets in Australia. Chinese yum cha wholesale outlets and Asian frozen food companies also commonly sell this snack frozen for home cooking. They can also be found at Chinese food outlets in New Zealand. 

The term dim sim dates as far back as 1928, although the modern recipe of the dish most likely was developed in Melbourne's Chinatown in 1945 by entrepreneur William Chen Wing Young for his food processing  company Wing Lee. The larger circular version of the dish is commonly known as a "South Melbourne dim sim" due to it originating at South Melbourne Market.

Original recipe
William Wing Young's "original recipe" for the dim sim was presented by Elizabeth Chong on the second episode of the ABC1 TV show Myf Warhurst's Nice (20 June 2012). It consisted of pork, prawns, water chestnuts, spring onions, and soy sauce wrapped in a soft skin-like wrapper.

See also 
 Dim sum
 Chinese restaurants in Australia

References

External links

Australian snack foods
Australian cuisine
Dumplings
Chinese-Australian culture
Australian Chinese cuisine